Pedro Henrique de Oliveira or simply Pedrinho (born 4 May 1994) is a Brazilian professional footballer who plays as an attacking midfielder for OFK Grbalj. In 2014, he played for Boa Esporte in Série B, also on loan.

Career
Pedrinho came through the youth system of São Paulo, where he was contracted until 2016. He spent the 2014 season on loan to Série B club Boa Esporte. He played in the first seven matches of the season, scoring once, but lost his place after the domestic season was interrupted by the World Cup. He joined América Mineiro, also on loan, for the 2015 season.

In January 2019, Pedrinho joined OFK Grbalj.

References

External links
 
 Pedrinho at ZeroZero

Living people
Sportspeople from Federal District (Brazil)
Brazilian footballers
Association football midfielders
São Paulo FC players
Boa Esporte Clube players
América Futebol Clube (MG) players
Sampaio Corrêa Futebol Clube players
Campeonato Brasileiro Série B players
1994 births